Bashkim is a masculine given name, which means "unity" in Albanian. The name may refer to:

People
Bashkim Dedja (born 1970), Albanian judge
Bashkim Fino (1962–2021), Albanian politician and prime minister
Bashkim Gazidede (1952–2008), Albanian politician
Bashkim Kadrii (born 1991), Danish football player
Bashkim Pitarka, Albanian diplomat
Bashkim Shehu (born 1955), Albanian writer

See also
Bashkimi (disambiguation)

Albanian masculine given names